Small Brown Bike is a band from Marshall, Michigan, United States that started in 1996. The trademark of Small Brown Bike is their "double vocals" backed by melodies.  Their sound is often identified as being similar to other post-hardcore bands, such as Avail, Hot Water Music and Dillinger Four. Throughout their existence, Small Brown Bike have toured three times with Dead Season between 1999 and 2000 and once with Thoughts of Ionesco in 1999. Their last show was in 2004 at The Fireside Bowl in Chicago, after already agreeing to split up. Former members Mike Reed and Dan Jaquint later created the band LaSalle, with Reed's wife playing bass guitar.  Ben Reed also started the Great Sea Serpents based out of Chicago, IL.  Mike and Ben have also formed the band Able Baker Fox with former drummer Jeff Gensterblum and Nathan Ellis from the Casket Lottery.  Their first album "Voices" was released in January 2008.

The band name is derived from working on bicycles as they grew up together.

The band announced a return to songwriting on October 6, 2009, via their new website.

Reunion shows
The band played a few reunion shows in September 2007 to benefit a dear friend of the band who had been battling Leukemia:
September 7, 2007 at Kratfbrau Brewery in Kalamazoo, Michigan.
September 8, 2007 at Subterranean in Chicago, Illinois (2 shows).
September 9, 2007 at Small's Bar in Detroit, Michigan.
October 28, 2007 at The Fest  6 in Gainesville, Florida.

Original members
Mike Reed (guitar)
Ben Reed (bass)
Travis Dopp (guitar)
Dan Jaquint (drums)

Former members
 Jeff Gensterblum (drums)
 Scott Flaster (guitar)

Discography

Albums
 Our Own Wars - 1999 on No Idea Records
 Collection (compilation) - 1999 on No Idea Records
 Dead Reckoning - 2001 on No Idea Records
 The River Bed - 2003 on Lookout! Records
 Fell & Found - 2011 on No Idea Records
 Recollected - 2013 on Old Point Light Records

EPs and split records
 Demo Tape (aka 'Chinese Handstand Demo' - limited to under 50 copies) - 1997 on Five Finger Records
 No Place Like You EP - 1997 on Salinger Press
 ..and Don't Forget Me EP - 1998 on Salinger Press
 SBB/Cursive Split - 2001 on Makoto Recordings
 SBB/The Casket Lottery Split - 2002 on Second Nature Recordings
 Nail Yourself to the Ground EP - 2003 on No Idea Records
 Composite, Volume One 7" - 2009 on No Idea Records
 Composite, Volume Two 7" - 2010 on No Idea Records

Music videos
 See You in Hell (2001)
 Safe in Sound (2003)
 On Repeat (2011)

References

External links 
Small Brown Bike Official Page

American post-hardcore musical groups
Musical groups from Michigan
Musical groups established in 1996
Musical groups reestablished in 2009
Musical groups disestablished in 2004
Emo revival groups
1996 establishments in Michigan